Carthage, Ohio may refer to:
 Carthage, Cincinnati
 Etna, Licking County, Ohio, formerly called Carthage
 Kent, Ohio, includes an area that was originally platted as the village of Carthage in 1825